Lucy May van der Haar (née Garner; born 20 September 1994) is a British former professional racing cyclist, who rode professionally between 2013 and 2020 for the ,  and  teams. Van der Haar is a double junior world road race champion, winning in consecutive years, in 2011 and 2012.

Career

Early life
Van der Haar grew up in Cosby, Leicestershire. Her first cycling club was the Leicestershire Road Club. Competing with them from 2004 to 2012, she won many National Awards from both the British Schools Cycling Association and British Cycling. She remained in full-time education until 2012, when she left Countesthorpe Community College having completed her AS-levels.

Amateur career
Van der Haar won her first junior world title at the 2011 road world championships in Copenhagen. She was part of a late six-woman breakaway from the peloton and won the race comfortably in a sprint for the line. A year later, she retained her title in a bunch sprint finish of 19 riders at the championships in Valkenburg, Netherlands, having had a lead-out from Elinor Barker.

Professional career
Van der Haar signed a professional contract with UCI Women's Team  in October 2012, turning professional at the start of the 2013 season. In May 2013, she claimed her first professional victory on the opening stage of the Tour of Chongming Island in Shanghai, China.

Personal life
Van der Haar has a sister, Grace Garner, who is two years younger than her. She competed professionally as a racing cyclist, before also retiring in 2020. In July 2019, she married fellow cyclist Lars van der Haar, and in March 2022, announced she was pregnant with their first child.

Major results
Source:

2011
 1st  Road race, UCI Junior Road World Championships
 2nd Team pursuit, National Track Championships (with Hannah Barnes and Harriet Owen)
2012
 1st  Road race, UCI Junior Road World Championships
 1st  Road race, UEC European Junior Road Championships
 UEC European Junior Track Championships
1st  Team pursuit (with Amy Roberts and Elinor Barker)
1st  Scratch
2nd  Team sprint (with Dannielle Khan)
 National Track Championships
1st  Individual pursuit
2nd Team pursuit (with Corrine Hall and Harriet Owen)
2013
 3rd Overall Tour of Chongming Island
1st Stage 1
 6th Dwars door de Westhoek
 8th Drentse 8
2014
 2nd Drentse 8
 2nd 7-Dorpenomloop Aalburg
 3rd Dwars door de Westhoek
 3rd Grand Prix de Dottignies
 7th Overall The Women's Tour
2015
 1st Stage 1 La Route de France
 2nd Ronde van Gelderland
 5th La Madrid Challenge by La Vuelta
 6th Parel van de Veluwe
 9th Dwars door de Westhoek
 9th Diamond Tour
2016
 2nd Women's Tour de Yorkshire
 3rd Road race, National Road Championships
 5th Ronde van Gelderland
2017
 3rd Tour of Guangxi Women's Elite World Challenge
 3rd Omloop van de IJsseldelta
2018
 1st  Mountains classification Tour of Chongming Island
2019
 5th Road race, National Road Championships
 5th Overall Tour of Chongming Island
2020
 1st  Overall Dubai Women's Tour
1st  Points classification
1st Stage 1

References

External links
 Lucy Garner profile at Argos-Shimano website

 

English female cyclists
1994 births
Living people
Sportspeople from Leicester
Commonwealth Games competitors for England
Cyclists at the 2014 Commonwealth Games
People from Cosby, Leicestershire
Sportspeople from Leicestershire